Miss Congeniality may refer to:
Miss Congeniality (film), 2000 film, directed by Donald Petrie, starring Sandra Bullock and Benjamin Bratt
Miss Congeniality 2: Armed and Fabulous, a 2005 sequel
A special award, the "Miss Congeniality Award", given at beauty pageants, specifically at:
Miss Universe
Miss World 
Miss USA
Miss International Queen
Miss America 
Miss Teen USA
RuPaul's Drag Race
Amy Dumas, Miss Congeniality, professional wrestler